Channel 10 or TV10 may refer to:

Television
TVES (El Salvador), a Salvadoran public television network
Channel 10, a television channel from Bengali-language news 
Channel 10, a television channel from licensed in Israel
TV10 (Dutch TV channel), a proposed Dutch commercial television channel in 1989
TV10 Gold, a former Dutch television that aired between 1995 and 1998 and is now called 'Veronica'
Canal 10, a television channel from Nicaragua
Canal 10, a television channel from Uruguay
TV 10, a television channel in Sweden specializing in sports and documentaries
Channel 10 - Tucumán, a  free-to-air channel in the province of Tucumán, Argentina
Network 10, an Australian commercial television network
TEN (TV station), an Australian television station, part of Network 10
Channel Ten, a name used by Scottish Television until the mid-1960s
THKG10 (Kien Giang 10, Vietnam), an Kien Giang Television Station (before 2007)

Other uses
Channel 10 (album), a 2009 album by rap duo Capone-N-Noreaga

See also
 Channel 10 branded TV stations in the United States
 Channel 10 virtual TV stations in Canada
 Channel 10 virtual TV stations in Mexico
 Channel 10 virtual TV stations in the United States

For VHF frequencies covering 192-198 MHz:
 Channel 10 TV stations in Canada
 Channel 10 TV stations in Mexico
 Channel 10 digital TV stations in the United States
 Channel 10 low-power TV stations in the United States

10